Diaphus arabicus is a species of lanternfish found in the Western Indian Ocean and the Arabian Sea.

References

Myctophidae
Taxa named by Basil Nafpaktitis
Fish described in 1978